The 1911 Chattanooga Moccasins football team represented the University of Chattanooga as an independent during the 1911 college football season. It completed its five-game schedule with a record of 3–2.

Schedule

References

Chattanooga
Chattanooga Mocs football seasons
Chattanooga Moccasins football